WTI or wti may refer to:

Organizations
 Western Transportation Institute, in the College of Engineering at Montana State University in Bozeman, MT, US
 Wildlife Trust of India, a conservation organisation based in New Delhi, India
 Witness to Innocence, to abolish the death penalty in the US
 World Trade Institute, University of Bern, Switzerland
 World Tribunal on Iraq, a people's court

Other uses
 Berta language (ISO 639-3 code: wti), spoken in Sudan and Ethiopia
 Ward–Takahashi identity, in quantum field theory
 Waterloo station (Indiana) (Amtrak code: WTI), Indiana, US
 Weapons and Tactics Instructor, a training course supervised by the United States Marine Corps Training and Education Command
 West Texas Intermediate, a crude oil used as a pricing benchmark
 Winnersh Triangle railway station (National Rail code: WTI), Berkshire, England

See also

 
 
 WT (disambiguation)
 WT1 (disambiguation)
 WTL (disambiguation)